The Grande médaille de la chanson française is an award given by the Académie française to prominent singers in French. It was created in 1938. The award takes the form of a silver-gilt medal, hence its other name, "médaille de vermeil".

Winners
 1988 : Gilles Vigneault
 1989 : Claude Nougaro
 1990 : Louis Amade
 1991 : no award
 1992 : Mireille
 1993 : Barbara
 1994 : Guy Béart
 1995 : Charles Aznavour
 1996 : Robert Charlebois
 1997: Yves Simon
 1998: MC Solaar
 1999: no award
 2000: Henri Salvador
 2001: Michel Sardou
 2002: Alain Souchon
 2003: Pierre Perret
 2004: Renaud
 2005: Catherine Lara
 2006: Françoise Hardy
 2007: Serge Rezvani
 2008: Georges Moustaki
 2009: Anne Sylvestre
 2010: Francis Cabrel
 2011: David McNeil
 2012: Maxime Le Forestier
 2013: Serge Lama
 2014: William Sheller
 2015: Véronique Sanson
 2016: Jean-Jacques Goldman
 2017: Gérard Manset
 2018: Thomas Fersen
 2019: Vincent Delerm
 2020: Étienne Daho
 2021: Abdourahman Waberi

See also
 Grand Prix du roman de l'Académie française

References

External links
 Official website

French music awards
Académie Française awards